Orbit Unlimited is a science fiction novel by American writer Poul Anderson, first published in 1961.  Essentially a linked group of short stories, it recounts the colonisation of the planet Rustum, a fictional terrestrial world orbiting Epsilon Eridani, by a group of refugees from an authoritarian planet Earth bearing some resemblance to the historical Pilgrim Fathers. Although habitable, Rustum's atmospheric pressure is so great that only its mountains and high plateaus are suitable for human settlement. The novel, like much of Anderson's work, has a libertarian subtext as the colonists flee the oppression on their home planet.

Science background
Although Anderson had no way of knowing this at the time of writing, a planet is now known to orbit around Epsilon Eridani, a star only 10.5 light years from earth. It is a gas giant, similar to Jupiter, and orbits its star at a distance of 3.2 AU every seven years. Gravitational irregularities show that at least one other planet orbits the star.

However, as a character mentions in the novel (p. 17 of the 1972 Pyramid paperback edition), Epsilon Eridani was not the location of Rustum. Instead, Anderson chose the star e Eridani (now known as 82 Eridani) as Rustum's host star. 82 Eridani is 19.8 light years distant, categorized in the G5 stellar spectral class with approximately 97% of the mass of the Sun and 60% of its luminosity. To date, 3 hot super-Earths have been confirmed in orbit around the star. 82 Eridani is listed as one of the "top 100" targets of NASA's proposed Terrestrial Planet Finder mission.

References

External links 
 

1961 American novels
1961 science fiction novels
American science fiction novels
Fiction set around Epsilon Eridani
Novels by Poul Anderson
Libertarian science fiction books
Pyramid Books books